{{Speciesbox
| image = Lecidea lapicida 2 BG4.jpg
| image_caption = 
| taxon = Lecidea lapicida
| authority = (Ach.) Ach. (1803)
| synonyms =
{{collapsible list |
Lecidea austrogeorgica 
Lecidea confluens var. ochromela 
Lecidea contenebricans 
Lecidea contigua var. declinans 
Lecidea contigua var. declinascens 
Lecidea contigua var. lapicida 
Lecidea contigua var. ochromela  
Lecidea contigua var. ochromeliza 
Lecidea contigua var. variegata 
Lecidea contiguella 
Lecidea cyanescens 
Lecidea darbishirei 
Lecidea declinans 
Lecidea declinans f. ochromela 
Lecidea declinascens 
Lecidea declinascens f. ochromeliza 
Lecidea dendroclinis 
Lecidea hoelii 
Lecidea lapicida f. ochromela 
Lecidea lapicida f. ochromeliza 
Lecidea lapicida f. oxydata 
Lecidea lapicida subsp. lithophiloides 
Lecidea lapicida subsp. ochromelaLecidea lapicida var. declinans Lecidea lapicida var. lithophiloides Lecidea lapicida var. maungahukae Lecidea lapicida var. ochromela Lecidea lapicida var. theiodes Lecidea lapillicola Lecidea lithophiloides Lecidea metamorpha Lecidea ochromela Lecidea pantherina subsp. peralbida Lecidea pantherina var. achariana Lecidea pantherina var. subauriculata Lecidea parasema var. lapicida Lecidea peralbida Lecidea polycarpa Lecidea polycarpa var. declinans Lecidea pruinosula Lecidea rupicida Lecidea scotoplaca Lecidea subinvoluta Lecidea subkochiana Lecidea subplanata Lecidea subterluescens subsp. ochromeliza Lecidea swartzioidea var. lithophilioides Lecidea swartzioidea var. lithophiloides Lecidea theiodes Lecidea variegata Lecidea vestrogothica Lecidella lapicida Lecidella lapicida f. oxydata Lichen lapicida Lichen peltatus subsp. lapicida Patellaria lapicida 
}}
| synonyms_ref = 
}}Lecidea lapicida is a species of lichen in the family Lecideaceae. It has a worldwide distribution but it is rare in the tropics.Lecidea lapicida is a known host species to the lichenicolous fungus species Muellerella erratica, Muellerella pygmaea and Rhizocarpon furax.

See also
 List of Lecidea species

References

Lecideales
Lichen species
Lichens described in 1799
Taxa named by Erik Acharius